Peter Orloff (born 12 March 1944, Lemgo) is a German schlager singer, composer, producer, and songwriter. He had more than a dozen hit singles in West Germany in the 1960s and 1970s.

Singles
Saphir und Rubin / Mein schwarzer Engel 1966 
Das schönste Mädchen der Welt 1967 ("West German Original Recording" of a song by Günter Geißler)
Es ist nie zu spät 1967, GER #17 ("West German Original Recording" of a song by Klaus Sommer)
City Girl 1968, GER #20
Gold auf der Straße 1968, GER #26
Sie schaut mich immer wieder an 1968, GER #36
Eine Farm für schöne Mädchen 1969, GER #40
Monika 1969, GER #37
Baby Dadamda 1969, GER #26
Das brennt so heiß wie Feuer 1970, GER #31
Ein Mädchen für immer 1971, v #16
Wie ein Stern 1971 ("West German Original Recording" of a song by Frank Schöbel)
Ein Leben voll Liebe 1971, GER #38
Jeder hat dich gern, doch nur Einer hat dich lieb 1972, GER #46
Eliza 1973
Ein Engel auf Urlaub 1974
Zünd eine Kerze an und warte auf den Morgen 1975, GER #44
Suchst du die Liebe - Sunny Girl 1975
Ich bestell schon mal das Himmelbett 1976
Wilder Wein 1976
Bettler und Prinz 1977 (German version of "Needles and Pins" by The Searchers)
Die Nacht als Christina fortlief 1977, GER #39  (German version of "Lay Back in the Arms of Someone", Smokie)
Immer wenn ich Josy seh 1978, GER #23 (German version of Kara Kara, New World)
Cora, komm nach Haus 1979, GER #31 (German version of Tom Tom Turnaround, New World)
Ich liebe Dich 1979, GER #27
Königin der Nacht 1979
Suchst du die Liebe, Sunny Girl
War das schon alles?  1999
Zwischen Kirche und Kneipe 2001

External links 
 
 

German male singers
Schlager musicians
1944 births
Living people
Ich bin ein Star – Holt mich hier raus! participants